Blowering, New South wales is a rural locality in the Snowy Mountains of New South wales and a civil Parish of Buccleuch County.

Blowering is on the Snowy Mountains Highway, 10 kilometres south of Tumut, New South Wales, Australia. Blowering is on the Tumut River and the site of Blowering Dam.

References

Parishes of Buccleuch County
Localities in New South Wales
Geography of New South Wales